Ruy Ohtake (27 January 1938 — 27 November 2021) was a Brazilian architect. He was the son of artist Tomie Ohtake.

History
Son of Japanese artist Tomie Ohtake, Ruy Ohtake was known for his unusual architectural designs. Examples of his projects are the half-moon-shaped Hotel Unique, the Hotel Renaissance building, and commercial building Edifício Santa Catarina at Avenida Paulista - all three located in the city of São Paulo. Ohtake is also famous for the design of the Tomie Ohtake Cultural Institute and the commercial building next to it.

He majored in Architecture in 1960 at the University of São Paulo.

Personal life
Ohtake was married twice: first to Brazilian actress Célia Helena, who died in 1997, and later to architect Silvia Vaz. He had two children, Elisa and Rodrigo.

Ohtake died on 27 November 2021, in São Paulo at the age of 83.

See also
 Japanese community of São Paulo

Notes

External links
 Ruy Ohtake Architecture
 Instituto Tomie Ohtake

1938 births
2021 deaths
Brazilian architects
Brazilian people of Japanese descent
People from São Paulo